Judge Paul may refer to:

Charles Ferguson Paul (1902–1965), judge of the United States District Court for the Northern District of West Virginia
John Paul (judge) (1839–1901), judge of the United States District Court for the Western District of Virginia
John Paul Jr. (judge) (1883–1964), judge of the United States District Court for the Western District of Virginia
Maurice M. Paul (1932–2016), judge of the United States District Court for the Northern District of Florida